Knife+Heart is a 2018 horror-thriller film directed by Yann Gonzalez, who co-wrote the screenplay with Cristiano Mangione. It was produced by Charles Gillibert and stars Vanessa Paradis, Nicolas Maury, Kate Moran, Jonathan Genet and Romane Bohringer. An international co-production of France, Mexico and Switzerland, the film was selected to compete for the Palme d'Or at the 2018 Cannes Film Festival. The lead character is loosely based on Anne-Marie Tensi, a female producer specialized in gay pornography who was active in France in the 1970s and 1980s.

Plot
A young man dances in a nightclub. He spots a man wearing a leather mask and goes with him to a room to have sex. A black bird flies past him as he follows the masked man, who later ties him to a bed and kills him with a dildo containing a concealed, retractable blade. 
It is the summer of 1979 in Paris, and Anne, a producer and director of gay pornography, finds herself alone and in terror in an isolated area of the city at 5am. She arrives at a phone booth and calls her former girlfriend and film editor, Loïs, who tells her she must sober up and go home, that their relationship is over, and "My heart has gone dry." The following day, Anne's best friend and lead actor Archibald is trying to maintain a positive environment while they shoot Anne's next film. Anne arrives at the stage and spies on Loïs through a peephole as she works. Loïs expresses boredom with "the same old shit" when one of the crew brings her cans of newly shot dailies. Thierry, one of the actors, has trouble maintaining an erection. Archibald tells him to "ease up on the heroin," to which Valentin, another actor says, "It's not the dope, it's his paycheck," and Anne tells him if the money is not good enough, they can easily be replaced.
Later, at Archie's flat, Anne has strange dreams of birds and fire. The police call Archie looking for Anne. While being questioned at the precinct, it is revealed the young man murdered at the beginning, Karl, had starred in many of Anne's films. Karl's death forces Anne to find another actor; she meets a young labourer named Nans, who despite being heterosexual agrees to star in her upcoming film. Explaining to Archie that Nans is the spitting image of her former star Fouad, whom Archie says has joined the Foreign Legion, Anne is convinced that Nans will impress Loïs, and incorporates Karl's murder and her meeting with the police into the narrative of her new film, Anal Fury V. This greatly upsets Mouth of Gold, the troupe's resident Fluffer, who admits to Archie that he loved Karl.

Thierry, having played one of the officers in this scene, demands payment from Anne, who tells him he'll never act in another of her films. Thierry is later seen buying heroin. He is then murdered while nodding out in an abandoned car, after also being visited by the black bird. This murder is juxtaposed with Anne following Loïs to an underground club where Anne watches Loïs make out on the dance floor with her new lover, Moon. Anne returns to the studio and scratches something into one of the film reels. As Loïs runs through the footage the following day, the words, "YOU HAVE KILLED ME" are superimposed over a shot of Thierry. Immediately after she sees this, Loïs is informed that Thierry's body has been found.
While out together at a bar, the members of the crew discuss the murders, and Anne declares she has a new name for the film, Homocidal to which the camera operator François responds, "Is none of this affecting you at all?" At this moment, Martin, a former actor and now prostitute, enters with her group of friends. She explains that she is now Misia, and introduces her friends by name and area of expertise. Anne asks what Misia's speciality is, to which she replies, "I'm in search of mysteries." Anne hires Misia and her friends for the film's finale, where Anne herself is revealed to be the fictional masked killer. 
Later, Anne is alone at a lesbian bar where she watches a Grand Guignol performance.
That Sunday, the crew celebrates the shoot's wrap with a picnic in a forest, Loïs arrives as Misia is giving Anne a psychic reading, telling her to pay more attention to her dreams because they are there to guide her. Just after a black bird lands on Loïs' shoulder, the gathering is interrupted by a storm, and Loïs kisses Anne as they seek shelter under a tree. Loïs runs off saying she shouldn't have done that and she must meet with friends. Misia, separated from the group, becomes lost in the forest and is murdered by the masked killer.

Now quite drunk, in a torrential rainstorm, Anne arrives at the club entrance just as Loïs emerges from a taxi, she chases after Loïs and sexually assaults her, demanding that Loïs love her. The masked killer watches this from a distance. When Anne is distracted by the sound of a bird, Loïs runs away, leaving Anne deeply devastated. 
She dreams again of a bird, a fire, a knife, and screaming faces, waking at the lesbian bar where the Guignol actress hands her the morning paper reporting Misia's murder.
Anne tries to convince the police to protect them, but they dismiss her. However, an officer gives her a clue: in each crime scene, an iridescent black feather was found next to the corpse. Anne asks Archibald to help her find a pet shop to learn more about the feather. She meets a woman named L'oiselière at a strange obelisk in a wooded area, and is told by the woman's son Pierre, who bears a mutated, birdlike claw in place of his left hand, that the feather belongs to an extinct species of blind grackle, which myths say cured the sick and dying of their maladies in the ancient forest of Chaladre, the only known home of these birds. 

Anne travels to Chaladre by train, and finds a letter from Loïs in her purse, placed there by Archie. The letter states that Loïs hates Anne, wants nothing to do with her, and that she will finish editing the film as a final gesture in return for Anne agreeing to never again seek her out. At the station, Anne is met by Monsieur Vannier, an innkeeper who owns the house where Archie has arranged for her to stay.
She is taken to the forest by the innkeeper's daughter Cathy, who tells Anne she visited Paris only once, as a child. As Anne takes a swig from her ever-present bottle of whiskey, Cathy asks for a sip.
In the forest, she spots a cemetery where a lonely woman is grieving at a gravestone bearing the name Guy Favre. The woman asks Anne if she knows her son, whom she says speaks to her in her mind. On the drive back to the house, Cathy, who seems quite lonely, tells Anne the story of Guy Favre and his friend Hicham, two teens who both died in a mysterious barn fire many years earlier, although she says Guy's body was never found, and his parents buried a coffin with only clothing inside. Guy's father died, presumable by suicide, days later, and Guy's mother then went mad. Anne shares the last of her whiskey with Cathy before they get out of the car.
Anne asks Monsieur Vannier to procure another bottle of whiskey for her, and he asks that she not share it again with Cathy, because his daughter previously had a drinking problem and tried to leave him once, alone, to die. "She's all I have left."
Cathy then leaves some old newspaper clippings from her father's archives on Anne's bed, with a note saying she noticed that Anne was interested in the story. She says they probably won't see each other again before Anne returns to Paris, but she is glad they met, signing the note, "Your friend, Cathy." 

Believing she now knows who the killer is, Anne tells Archie to arrange another shoot with whomever he can get, with the instructions that this scene pays triple. As the shoot takes place elsewhere, Loïs is editing the final scene from Homocidal when she spots a mysterious figure in the footage. She calls Moon and demands that she pick her up immediately, they race to the shooting location.

Back at the shoot, issues with both the camera and the performers delay the process, which leads to an improvisation that involves turning the lights off and on again. As the lights go out, Guy appears and murders actor José El Hombre. Anne calls out to Guy in the darkness that she knows who he is. As Guy attempts to murder Anne, Loïs arrives, jumps in front of her, and is stabbed by Guy. She dies in Anne's arms as Guy escapes. 
Sometime later, Anne arrives at the Le Far West, the porn theatre that showcases her films, for the premiere of Homocidal — she drinks heavily and stays for multiple viewings. She is approached by a fan from the audience, to whom she says, "It was all Loïs." Nans arrives later, unaware that Anne is sitting up front. Guy is revealed to be in attendance as well, sitting in the row behind Nans. When a man sitting next to Nans asks if he has the pleasure of meeting the "famous Fouad," Nans dismisses his sexual advances and explains, "No, but you're not the first to confuse us." Meanwhile, Anne has a vision of all of her dead friends surrounding her in the seats, and Loïs dead onscreen in place of the masked killer in the film, waking up in time to see Nans leave the room.
After "Homicidal" ends, the trailer for "Spunk and the Land Alone," one of Anne's earlier films from 1977, begins playing. As she sees the actors being introduced onscreen, Anne realises that every murdered actor starred in this film, which recreated Guy's tragic story, all of them are dead, except Fouad!
Guy is out to murder all those involved, including Anne, and now he is after Nans, whom he has mistaken for Fouad.

Nans goes upstairs in the theatre to a darkened room where men meet for anonymous sex, and is followed by Guy, who attempts to murder him, but has a vision of Hicham, and is overcome by grief, repeatedly crying out Hicham's name. As Nans tells Guy he is mistaken, Guy moves to strike, and is interrupted by Anne, who once more calls his name and says she knows who he is. Cornered and in a panic, Guy takes another man hostage and drags him into the theatre, where the audience of gay men attack and kill him as payback for the fear he created in the community. Anne is overcome by grief as she understands the true tragedy of this moment.
Guy and Hicham's tragic love story is recalled with an epilogue: the boys were caught in the act by Guy's father, who castrated his son and murdered Hicham, setting the barn on fire to conceal his crime. In the forest, the magical Chaladre grackles revived Guy, now burned beyond recognition, caring for him and nursing him back to health. He has no memory and goes to live in Paris, where one day, he enters a theatre and sees these awful events being parodied on the screen, driving him to take revenge...
In a Postscript, we see Anne and her crew shooting again in a fantastical ancient Roman setting, where Archibald is costumed as a satyr, crawling amongst the writhing bodies of men making love against a glowing white backdrop. Is it real, or is it merely in Anne's dreams? Loïs appears, and embraces Anne. The two lovers kiss and it is as though all is well in the world. Yet, François pulls Anne away from Loïs, bringing her back to the real world. Loïs fades away into the backdrop. Archie and Anne look upon one another, the love they feel for one another as true friends is palpable. The pain they feel is also clear. But they live on. Life. Love. Grief. Life. Archie smiles. Anne smiles.
The End.

Cast

Reception
Katie Rife of The A.V. Club gave the film a grade of "B", calling it an "unabashedly queer tribute to the sleazier side of giallo cinema" and concluding: "Gonzalez seems to want us to admire the sex and violence rather than be aroused or frightened by them, a distinction that makes this perverse little thriller more of an intellectual pleasure than a prurient one. Still, maybe don't watch it with your mom."

References

External links
 
 

2018 films
2018 horror thriller films
2018 LGBT-related films
2010s erotic thriller films
2010s French-language films
2010s serial killer films
Erotic horror films
Films about gay male pornography
Films set in 1979
Films set in Paris
French erotic thriller films
French films about revenge
French LGBT-related films
French horror thriller films
French serial killer films
Giallo films
Lesbian-related films
LGBT-related horror thriller films
Mexican erotic drama films
Mexican horror thriller films
Mexican LGBT-related films
Swiss horror thriller films
Swiss LGBT-related films
French-language Swiss films
2010s French films
2010s Mexican films